Stamnodes reckseckeri is a species of geometrid moth in the family Geometridae. It is found in North America.

The MONA or Hodges number for Stamnodes reckseckeri is 7336.

References

Further reading

 
 

Stamnodini
Articles created by Qbugbot
Moths described in 1910